The Professorship of Law is a permanently-established professorship in law at the University of Cambridge, founded in 1973. It is not linked to any particular field of law, and its most recent holder was the English legal comparativist, John Bell. Bell now holds the title Emeritus Professor of Law (1973).

Its holders are chosen based on an outstanding teaching and research record of international stature in their field of scholarship, their commitment to building a leading research presence, the ability to further the academic planning and strategic development of law at the university, the ability to work with other teachers and students, and their enthusiasm towards training the next generation of researchers.

The university has also established a number of other Professorships of Law for single tenures (i.e. as personal chairs), for specific individuals.

Professors of Law (1973) 

 Kurt Lipstein (1973–1976)
 S. F. C. Milsom (1976–1990)
 Bill Cornish (1990–1995)
 Bob Hepple (1995–2001)
 John Bell (2001–2019)

Professors of Law (single-tenure establishments) 

 David Williams (British legal scholar) (1996)
 John R. Spencer (1995–2013)
 Kevin Gray (1993–2015)
 Simon Deakin (2006–)

See also 

 Rouse Ball Professor of English Law
 Regius Professor of Civil Law (Cambridge)
 Whewell Professor of International Law
 Sir David Williams Professor of Public Law

References 

 
Law
Law, *, Cambridge
1973 establishments in England